Jamie Leigh Anne Alexander Tisch (born August 30, 1968) is an American businesswoman and philanthropist.

Early life and education
Jamie Alexander Tisch was born on August 30, 1968 in Alabama. She is the daughter of Linda (née Tanana) and Edgar Franklin Alexander, who worked in air base technology.

Career
In 2008, Tisch and long-time friend, Elizabeth Wiatt opened Fashionology LA, a retail store in Beverly Hills, California featuring a build-a-bear approach to clothing.

Philanthropy
In 2003 Tisch Co-Founded the Entertainment Industry's Women's Cancer Research Fund (WCRF) along with Marion Laurie, Anne Douglas, Kelly Meyer and Quinn Ezralow. The Women's Cancer Research Fund was created to support innovative research, education, and outreach directed towards the early diagnosis, treatment and prevention of all women's cancers.

In October 2013, she co-chaired the black-tie gala for the opening of the Wallis Annenberg Center for the Performing Arts in Beverly Hills.

Personal life
She married Steve Tisch in October 1996 and later divorced. They have three children: Zachary, Holden and Elizabeth.

References

Living people
Businesspeople from Alabama
People from Beverly Hills, California
University of Alabama alumni
21st-century American businesspeople
American socialites
1968 births
Jamie